Mitchell Steven Williams (born November 17, 1964), nicknamed "Wild Thing", is an American former relief pitcher in Major League Baseball who played for six teams from 1986 to 1997. He was also a studio analyst for the MLB Network from 2009 to 2014.

Williams, a left-hander with a high-90s fastball and major control issues, was largely effective, especially in the early part of his career earning 192 saves in his 11 seasons including a career high of 43 in 1993. He gave up a walk-off home run to Joe Carter of the Toronto Blue Jays in the sixth game of the 1993 World Series, which gave Toronto a World Series championship win over the Phillies.  Williams' career went into decline afterward, although he played in parts of three more major league seasons.

Early playing career
Williams was drafted out of high school in West Linn, Oregon, in 1982, by the San Diego Padres. The Texas Rangers acquired him in 1985, and he made his major league debut for the Rangers in 1986. It was with the Rangers that Williams earned the nickname "Wild Thing" due in large part to his awkward delivery to the plate in which he would fall to the third base side of the mound during his follow through, and also because of issues he had with control. The Rangers traded him to the Chicago Cubs after the 1988 season.

Chicago Cubs
Williams' extravagant wind-up and release, as well as his frequent wild pitches, drew comparisons to film character Rick "Wild Thing" Vaughn (played by Charlie Sheen) in the 1989 David S. Ward film Major League. When he joined the Cubs, Wrigley Field organist Gary Pressy began playing The Troggs' "Wild Thing" as he came out of the bullpen, mimicking the scenes in the film. 

A power reliever, he put his full weight behind every pitch, so that he dropped hard to the right, sometimes falling off the mound. In 1993, Williams started wearing the number 99 (he originally wore the number 28) on his jersey, the same number that Vaughn wore in the film. According to an interview on  The Dan Patrick Show on October 22, 2008, the number change had nothing to do with the Major League film. Williams said he had wanted the number 99 for years and years because of an admiration for the football player Mark Gastineau, who also wore number 99. Williams said that he did not change his number until 1993 because that was his first chance to do it.

Cubs manager Don Zimmer said Williams "did everything 99 miles an hour", and teammate and close friend Mark Grace said "Mitch pitches like his hair's on fire." The New Yorker baseball reviewer Roger Angell chortled over his "scary, hilarious antics", saying "he flung the ball and then... flung himself after it, winding up with his back to home plate... peering over his left shoulder in case anyone accidentally made contact."

1989
One of Williams's best seasons came in 1989 as a member of the Chicago Cubs. Williams had a win–loss record of 4–4 with a 2.76 ERA, 67 strikeouts (in 76 appearances during the regular season) and 36 saves. That year, Williams made the All-Star team for the only time in his career. He also hit the only home run of his career that season.  He was a key figure in the Cubs winning the National League East title in 1989.

Williams is the only player in MLB history to record a save without throwing a pitch. On April 28, 1989, he entered the game against the San Diego Padres with a 3–1 lead and two outs in the ninth inning. Williams picked off the Padres' Carmelo Martínez at second base to end the game.

National League Championship Series
In the League Championship Series against the San Francisco Giants, Williams made two appearances, in Games 2 and 5. He did not give up any earned runs and recorded two strikeouts. 

However, in Game 5, with the score tied at 1–1 in the bottom of the eighth inning, Williams gave up a two-run RBI single to Will Clark. Williams was removed, and NBC's cameras caught him in the dugout with a towel over his head. Moments later, the Giants finished the Cubs off to win their first National League pennant in 27 years.

Philadelphia Phillies
The Cubs dealt Williams to the Philadelphia Phillies at the start of the 1991 campaign. That year, he won 12 games, including eight in August, and saved 30 for the Phillies. However, he suffered eight losses in 1992 and seven more in 1993. Still, manager Jim Fregosi chose Williams as the team's closer entering the World Series against the defending champion Toronto Blue Jays.

On July 2, 1993, in the second game of a 12-hour double-header delayed repeatedly by rain, Williams came up to bat in the tenth inning and ended the game at 4:40 am with an RBI single, the only walk-off hit of his career.  Williams recorded it off Trevor Hoffman, one of the only two closers to have 600 or more saves.

During Williams' time in Philadelphia, a punk rock cover of the song "Wild Thing" (the same one used in the Major League films) was played when he made his entrance from the bullpen.

1993 World Series

During that World Series, whenever Williams was on the mound, his nervous teammate Curt Schilling was caught by CBS television cameras with a towel over his head. Schilling's behavior not only irked Williams (who to this day harbors bitter feelings towards Schilling), but also fellow Phillies teammates like Larry Andersen and Danny Jackson, who accused Schilling of purposely trying to get more camera time. On subsequent nights, several other Phillies were seen wearing towels—possibly to keep Schilling from looking unique. The gesture was taken up almost as a good-luck charm by fans in the seats.

Williams earned a save in Game 2 of the series, relieving Terry Mulholland as the Phillies tied the series at a game each. However, Williams suffered the loss in Game 4, the highest-scoring game in World Series history, as the Blue Jays scored six times in the eighth inning to earn a 15–14 victory and take a 3–1 series lead. Afterwards, Williams received death threats from angry Phillies fans for blowing the game.

After the Phillies won Game 5 in a complete-game shutout by Curt Schilling, the series returned to Toronto for Game 6. The Phillies scored five runs in the seventh inning to take a 6–5 lead, and it was up to Williams to preserve the victory and force a Game 7. With one out and two runners on base in the bottom of the ninth inning, Joe Carter hit a 2–2 pitch over the left-field wall for a walk-off home run, giving the Blue Jays an 8–6 victory and a World Series championship.

Williams later placed the blame on himself for what happened in the 1993 World Series, adding that he had put the ordeal behind him:

—Mitch Williams on his feelings about surrendering the home run to Joe Carter

In 2011, 17 years after giving up the World Series home run, Williams said he regretted using the slide step when pitching to Carter. In a joint interview with Carter for the MLB Network's 20 Greatest Games series, Williams said he hadn't used the slide step before but was talked into doing so by pitching coach Johnny Podres after allowing a walk to base-stealing legend Rickey Henderson.

Despite having the highest number of lefty saves in his career with the Phillies (102), the Carter blast was the end of the line for Williams in Philadelphia. The Phillies traded him to the Houston Astros prior to the start of the 1994 season.

Post-Phillies career
Williams' post-Phillies career was a comedown from his previous heights. He would register only two wins and six saves in his final three major league seasons, with an ERA of 6.75 or above in all three campaigns.  After two months with Houston in 1994, Williams closed out his major league career with equally short stints with the California Angels in 1995 and the Kansas City Royals in 1997.

Retirement 
Williams retired from baseball to operate a bowling establishment outside Philadelphia. Although Phillies fans continued to blame Williams for the 1993 World Series loss for several years afterward, the fact that he did not make excuses for the blown save, shift the blame to others, or hide from the media or the city of Philadelphia caused many fans to ultimately forgive him and embrace him once again as a local figure.

In 1996, the MLB All-Star Game was held in Philadelphia. The network broadcasting the game set up a bowling match between Williams and Carter at Williams' own lanes. Before the match Williams jokingly stated that Carter had no chance to win because Williams played every day. Williams did not know that Carter had been a talented bowler growing up. Carter got to the bowling alley and on his first warm up roll took a couple steps, spun around 180 degrees and rolled the ball between his legs, backwards, for a strike. Carter won the match handily.

The Atlantic City Surf of the independent Atlantic League lured Williams back into uniform to pitch in 2001. He went 4–3 for the Surf that season and then became the club's pitching coach for 2002 and 2003. His paperwork and people skills were not strengths, and he was not retained as coach after a year and a half. Williams has been out of professional baseball since then.

In July 2011, Williams participated in a House Crashers episode from the DIY Network, in which a local Phillies fan won a makeover of his home's sports den.

Williams sued Deadspin and MLB Network, claiming defamation and breach of contract in 2014 for a report on him regarding his actions during a youth baseball tournament, including his alleged cursing of an umpire and calling children on other teams derogatory names. Williams apologized for his behavior at the tournament. In June 2016, Williams's suit against Deadspin was dismissed by summary judgment. In June 2017, Williams prevailed in his lawsuit against MLB Network and was awarded $1.5 million by a jury.

He and former teammate Lenny Dykstra were involved in a profane exchange, captured on camera, during a May 2015 sports roast in Philadelphia.

Broadcasting 
In March 2007, Williams joined Philadelphia radio station 610 WIP AM as a part-time cohost of the Angelo Cataldi and the Morning Team show heard from 5:30 to 10:00 am on weekdays. Williams generally appeared one day per week. In April 2007, Williams joined Comcast SportsNet Philadelphia as a post-game analyst for broadcasts of Philadelphia Phillies games. On January 3, 2009, Williams joined MLB Network as a studio analyst where he was a regular on the network's MLB Tonight program until 2014.

Williams serves as a color commentator for Fox Sports occasionally commentating national games.  Williams came under some criticism for stating that the correct way to catch a fly ball was with one hand rather than two, after Cincinnati Reds outfielder Fred Lewis made an error in a game vs. the Atlanta Braves on July 23, 2011.

References

Bell, Christopher, Scapegoats: Baseballers Whose Careers Are Marked by One Fateful Play (c)2002  McFarland and Company.

External links

Mitch Williams anecdote on anecdotage.com
 

1964 births
Living people
Sportspeople from Santa Ana, California
Major League Baseball pitchers
National League All-Stars
Philadelphia Phillies players
Houston Astros players
Kansas City Royals players
California Angels players
Chicago Cubs players
Texas Rangers players
People from Medford, New Jersey
People from West Linn, Oregon
Baseball players from California
MLB Network personalities
Walla Walla Padres players
Spokane Indians players
Reno Padres players
Salem Redbirds players
Tulsa Drillers players
Clearwater Phillies players
Scranton/Wilkes-Barre Red Barons players
Omaha Royals players
Atlantic City Surf players
Major League Baseball broadcasters
Baseball players from Oregon
Sportspeople from the Portland metropolitan area
Sportspeople from the Delaware Valley